Dooley is an Irish surname.  Notable people with the surname include:
 Bill Dooley (born 1934), American football coach and brother of Vince Dooley
 Billy Dooley (born 1969), Irish hurling player
 Brian Dooley (writer) (born 1971), British television writer
 Brian J. Dooley (born 1963), Irish human rights activist
 Cal Dooley (born 1954), American politician
 Charlie Dooley (fl. 1960s–2010s), American politician
 Derek Dooley (footballer) (1929–2008), British football player and manager
 Derek Dooley (American football) (born 1968), college football coach; son of Vince Dooley and nephew of Bill Dooley
 Dooley Wilson (1886–1953), actor and star of Casablanca
 Edwin B. Dooley (1905–1982), American politician
 Eliza B. K. Dooley (1880–1958), American artist, writer, government official in Puerto Rico
 Jackie M. Dooley (fl. 1990s–2010s), American archivist
 James Dooley (disambiguation):
James Dooley (Australian politician) (1877–1950), Premier of New South Wales
James Dooley (composer) (born 1976), American film score composer
James H. Dooley (1841–1922), American lawyer and politician
 Jim Dooley (1930–2008), American football player and manager
 John Dooley (disambiguation)
 Kevin Dooley (born 1953), comics editor
 Kevin J. Dooley (born 1961), American scholar and professor
 Mark Dooley, Irish philosopher and writer
 Michael Dooley, Seventh Catholic Bishop of Dunedin (2018–present)
 Mike Dooley, New Zealand musician
 Norval Dooley, Australian Army officer and solicitor
 Pat Dooley, Georgia state Representative
 Paul Dooley, American actor
 Ray Dooley, American actor
 Shaun Dooley, British actor
 Shawn Dooley, Massachusetts state representative
 Stacey Dooley, British TV journalist 
 Taylor Dooley, American actress
 Thomas Dooley (born 1961), German-American soccer player
 Thomas Anthony Dooley III, American physician
 Thomas E. Dooley, American business executive
 Timmy Dooley, Irish politician
 Tom Dooley (editor), American journalist
 Tom Dooley (American football), American football official
 Tyler Dooley, American reality television contestant and nephew of Meghan, Duchess of Sussex
 Vince Dooley (born 1932), American football coach, and brother of Bill Dooley and father of Derek Dooley
 Vol Dooley (born 1927–-2014), Louisiana sheriff
 Wade Dooley, British rugby player
 Mr. Dooley, a fictional bartender in stories by Finley Peter Dunne

Other uses
Dooley, Virginia
Dooley, Montana

See also

 Dooly (disambiguation)
 Dooley's
 Dooleys
 Tom Dooley (song)
 Justice Dooley (disambiguation)

Surnames of Irish origin